Drum and bugle corps is a name used to describe several related musical ensembles. 

 Drum and bugle corps (modern), a musical marching unit
 Drum and bugle corps (classic), musical ensembles that descended from military bugle and drum units returning from World War I and succeeding wars
 Fanfare band, a variant ensemble composed of related instruments, prevalent in Europe

See also
 Corps of drums, a musical unit of several national armies